Graham Philip Brazier (6 May 1952 – 4 September 2015) was a New Zealand musician and songwriter. He first came to prominence in the band Hello Sailor.  After Hello Sailor, he formed a band called the Legionnaires. When he was growing up, he lived above his mother's bookshop in Dominion Road in Auckland and he collected first editions.

Early life 
His childhood was fashioned seeing R.A.K. Mason, Rex Fairburn, Kevin Ireland and other writers in the shop. Graham left Mt Roskill Grammar at age 15 for his first job at Whitcombe & Tombs. He began writing songs when he was 19.

Career 

Although Brazier claimed he turned down an offer to join The Doors post-Jim Morrison, it was stated by Doors ex-manager and biographer, Danny Sugerman, to be "somewhat exaggerated".

Two Brazier associated songs are included in the official top 100 New Zealand songs. They are "Blue Lady" alongside his first band, Hello Sailor, as well as "Billy Bold" from his solo career.

It was reported on 7 October 2012 that Brazier was charged with assaulting his two former partners. He pleaded guilty to two counts of male assaults female and one count of common assault.

Brazier suffered a heart attack in August 2015, and died in Auckland on 4 September 2015.

Brazier's posthumous solo album Left Turn at Midnite, completed after Brazier's death by close friend producer Alan Jansson, was released in May 2017.

Solo discography
Inside Out (Polygram), 1981
Brazier (CBS), 1987 (spent one week in the NZ album chart at No. 49 in February 1988)
East of Eden (Wildside) March 2004
Left Turn at Midnite (Ripe Coconut) May 2017

Awards

Aotearoa Music Awards
The Aotearoa Music Awards (previously known as New Zealand Music Awards (NZMA)) are an annual awards night celebrating excellence in New Zealand music and have been presented annually since 1965.

! 
|-
| 2011 || Graham Brazier(as part of Hello Sailor) || New Zealand Music Hall of Fame ||  || 
|-

References

Further reading
 Dix, John, Stranded in Paradise, Penguin, 2005. 
 Eggleton, David, Ready To Fly, Craig Potton, 2003. 
 Spittle, Gordon, Counting The Beat, GP Publications, 1997.

External links

Graham Brazier on the Hello Sailor website
Graham Brazier on the Wildside Records website

The Brazz in New Zealand Listener

1952 births
2015 deaths
APRA Award winners
New Zealand male singer-songwriters
New Zealand rock singers
People educated at Mount Roskill Grammar School
20th-century New Zealand male musicians
20th-century New Zealand male singers
21st-century New Zealand male singers